"Hard Labour" is the 20th episode of third season of the British BBC anthology TV series Play for Today. The episode was a television play that was originally broadcast on 12 March 1973. "Hard Labour" was written and directed by Mike Leigh, produced by Tony Garnett, and starred Liz Smith in her first major role. 

The episode is the most clearly drawn in all Leigh's work from the background in Higher and Lower Broughton where he grew up. "Though elements of autobiography are buried in all Leigh's films and plays, only Hard Labour is set in Salford, – the scenes in the Stones' house were shot in a house just two doors along from where the Leighs had lived in Cavendish Road."

Cast
 Liz Smith as Mrs Thornley
 Clifford Kershaw as Mr Thornley
 Polly Hemingway as Ann
 Bernard Hill as Edward
 Alison Steadman as Veronica
 Vanessa Harris as Mrs Stone
 Cyril Varley as Mr Stone
 Ben Kingsley as Naseem

Theme
"The polarity between the worlds of Mrs Stone and the lady who cleans her house (the central figure, Mrs Thornley, the Catholic house-cleaner) is icily delineated. In the middle is the new housing estate, where Mrs Thornley's son, Edward, (played by Bernard Hill in his professional début), a car mechanic, lives with his wife Veronica (Alison Steadman)."

References

External links
 
 "Hard Labour" at BFI Screenonline

1973 British television episodes
1973 television plays
British television plays
Play for Today
Films directed by Mike Leigh